Euscorpiops montanus, is a species of scorpion native to Bhutan, India and Pakistan.

References

 Biolib
 Insects.tamu.edu
 Mes Scorpions

Euscorpiidae
Animals described in 1879
Arthropods of India
Fauna of Bhutan
Fauna of Pakistan